Seoul Metropolitan City Route 20 is a road located in Seoul, South Korea.

Stopovers
 Seoul
 Eunpyeong District - Jongno District - Seongbuk District - Nowon District

List of Facilities 
IS: Intersection, IC: Interchange

References

Roads in Seoul